Psammobatis is a genus of skates in the family Arhynchobatidae. These fish are found in the Atlantic and Pacific oceans off southern South America.

Species
 Psammobatis bergi Marini, 1932 (Blotched sand skate)
 Psammobatis extenta (Garman, 1913) (Zipper sand skate)
 Psammobatis lentiginosa McEachran, 1983 (Freckled sand skate)
 Psammobatis normani McEachran, 1983 (Shortfin sand skate)
 Psammobatis parvacauda McEachran, 1983 (Smalltail sand skate)
 Psammobatis rudis Günther, 1870 (Smallthorn sand skate)
 Psammobatis rutrum D. S. Jordan, 1891 (Spade sand skate)
 Psammobatis scobina (Philippi {Krumweide}, 1857) (Raspthorn sand skate)

References 
 

 
Rajidae
Ray genera
Taxa named by Albert Günther
Taxonomy articles created by Polbot